The Murcia–Almería high-speed rail line is an under-construction railway in the Region of Murcia and Andalusia in Spain.

History
Murcia and Almería were once linked by rail from Lorca to Guadix via Baza, however this line closed in 1985. When the AVE high speed rail network opened in 1992, it continued to expand, with the Madrid–Levante high-speed rail network reaching Alicante railway station in 2013, and will reach Murcia del Carmen railway station in 2021. A continuation from Murcia to Almería railway station was proposed, and construction of the new high-speed line began in 2010, but was suspended due to political disagreements. In 2017 the Spanish government announced that work would restart in 2019, to be completed by 2023.  The railway's estimated completion date has since been pushed to 2026.

Route
The line will serve as a continuation of the Madrid–Levante high-speed rail network at Murcia, serving stations at Lorca and Vera before terminating in Almería. The trip from Murcia to Almería is expected to take 1 hour 5 minutes, and 3.5 hours to Madrid, compared to the current six hours taken using the existing Linares Baeza–Almería railway.

References

High-speed railway lines in Spain
Almería
Murcia
Region of Murcia
Province of Almería
Standard gauge railways in Spain